Michael Malone (born September 15, 1971) is an American professional basketball coach who is the head coach of the Denver Nuggets of the National Basketball Association (NBA). He has also been the head coach of the Sacramento Kings. Malone previously served as an assistant coach of the New York Knicks, Cleveland Cavaliers, New Orleans Hornets, and Golden State Warriors.

Early life and education
Born in the Astoria neighborhood of the New York City borough Queens, Malone is the son of Brendan Malone, a former NBA head coach. After graduating from Seton Hall Preparatory School, Malone attended prep school at Worcester Academy in the 1988–89 school year. He then graduated from Loyola University Maryland in 1994 with a degree in history and played on the Loyola Greyhounds men's basketball team from 1989 to 1993. He appeared in 107 games and started 39 of them as a point guard. During his four seasons with the Greyhounds, Malone totaled 370 points, 279 assists and 79 steals in 18.5 minutes per game.

Coaching career
While completing his degree at Loyola, Malone was an assistant high school basketball coach at Friends School of Baltimore. After graduating from Loyola, Malone joined Oakland University as an assistant coach for Golden Grizzlies men's basketball under coach Greg Kampe. Malone was about to start training to join the Michigan State Police before getting a job offer from Providence College coach Pete Gillen. Malone was an assistant coach for Providence Friars men's basketball from 1995 to 1998. In the 1998–99 season, Malone was director of men's basketball administration at the University of Virginia.

Early NBA years (2001–2011)
He later moved up to the NBA in 2001 as a coaching associate with the New York Knicks who worked with players, coaching staff, personnel and the video coordinator and edited scouting reports. The Knicks promoted Malone to assistant coach in 2003. Allowing a league-best 8.7 fewer points per game than last season, the Hornets had the most improved defense of the season with Malone as assistant and made the 2011 Playoffs.

Golden State Warriors (2011–2013)
The Golden State Warriors hired Malone in the summer of 2011 as an assistant coach under Mark Jackson. As the sixth seed in the 2013 NBA Playoffs, the Warriors upset the third-seed Denver Nuggets in the first round and lost to the eventual Western Conference champion San Antonio Spurs in six games the next round. In 2012, Malone was named the best assistant coach by the NBA general managers. Several Warriors, including Draymond Green and Stephen Curry have credited Malone as being a huge part of the team's success after his departure.

Sacramento Kings (2013–2014)
On June 3, 2013, Malone was hired by majority owner Vivek Ranadivé as the new head coach of the Sacramento Kings. With the hiring, Malone and his father became the second father-son duo in NBA history, after Bill Musselman and Eric Musselman, to head coach an NBA team. On December 15, 2014, he was fired by the Kings after starting the 2014–15 season with an 11–13 win–loss record.

Denver Nuggets (2015–present) 
On June 15, 2015, he was named the new head coach of the Denver Nuggets. In the 2018–19 season, Malone led the Nuggets to the second seed in the Western Conference, behind the Golden State Warriors, with a 54–28 record. In the Nuggets first playoff berth in six seasons, Denver defeated the San Antonio Spurs in the First Round in seven games, before being eliminated in the Semi-finals by the Portland Trail Blazers, also in seven games.

On December 24, 2019, the Nuggets announced that they had agreed to a contract extension with Malone. During the 2020 playoffs in the NBA Bubble, the Nuggets would become the first team in league history to overcome multiple 3–1 deficits in a single postseason, defeating the Utah Jazz and Los Angeles Clippers in the First Round and Semi-finals respectively, in seven games after trailing 3–1 each series. Despite the historic feat, Denver would be eliminated in the Western Conference Finals by the eventual NBA champion, the Los Angeles Lakers, in five games.

On March 23, 2022, Malone and the Nuggets reached an agreement on a multi-year contract extension.

National team coaching career
In January 2020, Malone joined the Serbian national team coaching staff as a consultant for the Olympic Qualifying Tournament.

Personal life
Malone and his wife have two daughters.

Head coaching record

|-
| style="text-align:left;"|Sacramento
| style="text-align:left;"|
| 82||28||54|||| style="text-align:center;"|4th in Pacific||—||—||—||—
| style="text-align:center;"|Missed playoffs
|-
| style="text-align:left;"|Sacramento
| style="text-align:left;"|
| 24||11||13|||| style="text-align:center;"|(fired)||—||—||—||—
| style="text-align:center;"|—
|-
| style="text-align:left;"|Denver
| style="text-align:left;"|
| 82||33||49|||| style="text-align:center;"|4th in Northwest||—||—||—||—
| style="text-align:center;"|Missed playoffs
|-
| style="text-align:left;"|Denver
| style="text-align:left;"|
| 82||40||42|||| style="text-align:center;"|4th in Northwest||—||—||—||—
| style="text-align:center;"|Missed playoffs
|-
| style="text-align:left;"|Denver
| style="text-align:left;"|
| 82||46||36|||| style="text-align:center;"|5th in Northwest||—||—||—||—
| style="text-align:center;"|Missed playoffs
|-
| style="text-align:left;"|Denver
| style="text-align:left;"|
| 82||54||28|||| style="text-align:center;"|1st in Northwest||14||7||7||
| style="text-align:center;"|Lost in Conference Semi-finals
|-
| style="text-align:left;"|Denver
| style="text-align:left;"|
| 73||46||27|||| style="text-align:center;"|1st in Northwest||19||9||10||
| style="text-align:center;"|Lost in Conference Finals
|-
| style="text-align:left;"|Denver
| style="text-align:left;"|
| 72||47||25|||| style="text-align:center;"|2nd in Northwest||10||4||6||
| style="text-align:center;"|Lost in Conference Semi-finals
|-
| style="text-align:left;"|Denver
| style="text-align:left;"|
| 82||48||34|||| style="text-align:center;"|2nd in Northwest||5||1||4||
| style="text-align:center;"|Lost in First Round
|- class="sortbottom"
| style="text-align:center;" colspan="2"|Career||661||353||308|||| ||48||21||27||||

References

External links
 NBA.com profile
 College playing statistics

1971 births
Living people
American men's basketball coaches
American men's basketball players
Basketball coaches from New York (state)
Basketball players from New York City
Cleveland Cavaliers assistant coaches
Denver Nuggets head coaches
Guards (basketball)
Golden State Warriors assistant coaches
Loyola Greyhounds men's basketball players
Manhattan Jaspers basketball coaches
New Orleans Hornets assistant coaches
New York Knicks assistant coaches
Oakland Golden Grizzlies men's basketball coaches
People from Lafayette, California
People from Placer County, California
Providence Friars men's basketball coaches
Sacramento Kings head coaches
Seton Hall Preparatory School alumni
Sportspeople from Queens, New York
Worcester Academy alumni